Anna Polovetskaya (died 1111), was a Princess of Kyiv by marriage to Vsevolod I of Kiev.

She was the daughter of the Cuman khan. She married Vsevolod I in 1068. In connection to the wedding, she converted from her original faith, Tengrism, to Christianity, and was given the name Anna. 

When she was widowed in 1093, she stayed in Kyiv and was regarded with great respect and reverence. In 1097, she was asked to act as a mediator between her warring stepsons, and managed to secure peace and a resolution of the conflict. 

Her daughter, Eupraxia, became Holy Roman Empress when she married Henry IV, Holy Roman Emperor, in 1089.

References

  Филиповский, Ефрем. Краткое историческое и хронологическое описаніе жизни и дѣяній великих князей Россійских, царей, императоров и их пресвѣтлѣйших супруг и детѣй от Р. КH. с 862 года до нынѣ благополучно царствующаго Великаго Государя Императора Александра I. Самодержца Всероссийскаго, Ч.1, 1805 г.

11th-century births
1111 deaths
Year of birth unknown
12th-century Rus' women
Kievan Rus' princesses
11th-century Rus' women